The Saint Andrew's Golf Club is a golf club located in Hastings-on-Hudson, New York, United States.

History
Founded in 1888 by John Reid of Dunfermline, Scotland, the club is the oldest golf club in the United States. The club crest features a Scottish saltire. The current site, the club's home since 1897, features an 18-hole golf course designed by golf course architects William H. Tucker and Harry Tallmadge. In 1983, the track was refurbished by legendary golfer Jack Nicklaus.

United States Golf Association
Along with fellow Empire State club Shinnecock Hills Golf Club, Illinois's Chicago Golf Club, Rhode Island's Newport Country Club and Massachusetts's  The Country Club, Saint Andrew's Golf Club was, in 1895, one of the five founding members of the United States Golf Association, one of the sport's two major governing bodies.

In popular culture
Over the final two decades of the 20th century, the course was featured in a handful of articles in The New York Times. A 1983 article in the paper referenced a dwindling membership and the construction of condominium town houses with the goal of increasing membership. A 1989 story in the Times mentioned the club having recently admitted its first African-American member. And a 1997 piece in the paper, which discusses racial bias at area clubs, mentions the club's $20,000 initiation fee, $9,000 annual fee, and its predominantly white and Christian membership; the same article also mentioned that, until the 1970s, the club had exclusively opened its doors to Presbyterians of Scottish descent.

References

External links
 

Greenburgh, New York
Golf clubs and courses in New York (state)
Sports venues in New York (state)
1888 establishments in New York (state)